The Yellow River is a river in central Ireland, a tributary of the River Boyne.

Name

The Yellow River is called the Ownaboy/Ownaboy in the 1654 Civil Survey, an Anglicisation of abhainn buidhe, "yellow river."

Course

The Yellow River rises in Kilcorbry, north of Croghan (near 53.351°N 7.302°W) and flows in an easterly direction. It passes under the R400 and then turns northeast, flowing under Garr Bridge It meets several tributaries and then its last section forms part of the Meath–Offaly border and passes under Sheep Bridge south of Castlejordan. It meets the Monagh River and then passes under Clongall Bridge and later enters the Boyne near 53.3818°N 7.0816°W. From the tripoint of the townlands Stonehouse, Killowen (both in County Offaly) and Ballyfore (County Meath) (53.3956°N 7.1421°W) until the junction with the River Boyne the Yellow River forms the boundary of counties Offaly and Meath.

Wildlife
The Yellow River is known as a brown trout fishery.

See also
Rivers of Ireland

References

Rivers of County Meath
Rivers of County Offaly